Wainaina is a surname. Notable people with the surname include:

Angel Wainaina (1983–2009), Kenyan actress, radio presenter and rapper
Binyavanga Wainaina (1971–2019), Kenyan writer
Catherine Wainaina (born 1985), Kenyan beauty pageant winner
Eric Wainaina (musician) (born 1973), Kenyan singer-songwriter
Erick Wainaina (born 1973), Kenyan marathon runner
Fidelis Wainaina, Kenyan activist
Njoki Wainaina